Sir Edward Cuthbert Bairstow (22 August 18741 May 1946) was an English organist and composer in the Anglican church music tradition.

Life and career
Bairstow was born in Trinity Street, Huddersfield in 1874. His grandfather Oates Bairstow was founder of the eponymous clothing firm.

He studied the organ with John Farmer at Balliol College, Oxford, and while articled under Frederick Bridge of Westminster Abbey received tuition from Walter Alcock. He studied organ and theory at the University of Durham, receiving the Bachelor of Music in 1894, and the Doctor of Music in 1901.

After holding posts in London, Wigan and Leeds, he served as organist of York Minster from 1913 to his death, when he was succeeded by his former pupil Francis Jackson. Jackson went on to write a biography of Bairstow. He was knighted in 1932.

Notorious for his terseness and bluntness, Bairstow did not always endear himself to others. Asked whether he would be willing to follow the example of his predecessor at York, Thomas Tertius Noble, and emigrate to the United States, he replied that he would "rather go to the devil". Comfortably ensconced in Yorkshire, where he was a close friend of the equally blunt Charles Harry Moody, organist at Ripon Cathedral, he refused an offer to succeed Sydney Nicholson at Westminster Abbey. He instead recommended his erstwhile pupil Ernest Bullock, who was duly appointed to the post.

Key dates
1893 Organist of All Saints, Norfolk Square
1899 Organist of Wigan Parish Church
1906 Organist of Leeds Parish Church
1913 Master of Music, York Minster
1932 Knighted for services to music

Compositions
Bairstow's compositions are mainly for the church. He wrote 29 anthems, ranging from large-scale works for choir and organ such as Blessed city, heavenly Salem to miniatures like I sat down under his shadow and Jesu, the very thought of thee. Among his anthems, Let all mortal flesh keep silence is perhaps the best known. His service music includes published settings in D (Evening 1906, Communion 1913, Morning 1925), E♭ (Full Setting, 1923), and G (Evening, 1940), and several unpublished works. He also composed psalm chants, hymn tunes, and a cantata, The Prodigal Son, for choir and chamber orchestra.

Bairstow was also active as an instrumental composer, mainly for the organ, and some 12 pieces were published in his lifetime, among them the 1937 Sonata in E♭. His small output of chamber music includes a set of variations for two pianos and another set of variations for violin and piano, both long out of print.

Key works
If the Lord had not helped me
Blessed city, Heavenly Salem (based on the plainsong "Urbs beata")
Lord, Thou hast been our refuge
 I sat down under his shadow
Let all mortal flesh keep silence
The Lamentations of Jeremiah
Sing ye to the Lord
Save us, O Lord
Though I speak with the tongues of men
Jesu grant me this I pray (Taken from "Orlando Gibbons")
The King of love my shepherd is
 Evening Service in G minor
 Evening Service in D
Evening song, for organ (From the Sibley Music Library Digital Score Collection)
Prelude, Elegy and Toccata for organ (From the Sibley Music Library Digital Score Collection)

Books
Counterpoint and Harmony: MacMillan/Stainer & Bell, 1937, 1945 (2nd ed). Republished 2007 by the Bairstow Press, .
The Evolution of Musical Form: Oxford University Press, 1943.
Singing Learned from Speech: A Primer for Teachers and Students: Macmillan, 1945.

References

Francis Jackson. "Bairstow, Sir Edward C(uthbert)", Grove Music Online, ed. L. Macy (accessed 19 August 2005), grovemusic.com  (subscription access).
Francis Jackson: Blessed City: The Life and Works of Edward C. Bairstow 1874-1946. York, William Sessions Ltd., 1993. , ; 2nd rev. ed. Hyperion Books, 1997. ,

External links
 
 
Francis Jackson remembers Edward Bairstow

1874 births
1946 deaths
English classical composers
English classical organists
British male organists
Cathedral organists
Musicians from Huddersfield
Classical composers of church music
Knights Bachelor
Composers awarded knighthoods
Musicians awarded knighthoods
Alumni of Durham University
Alumni of Balliol College, Oxford
English male classical composers
Male classical organists
Presidents of the Independent Society of Musicians